The Rule of Three (also Three-fold Law or Law of Return) is a religious tenet held by some Wiccans, Neo-Pagans and occultists. It states that whatever energy a person puts out into the world, be it positive or negative, will be returned to that person three times. Some subscribe to a variant of this law in which return is not necessarily threefold.

Rule of Three is sometimes described as karma by Wiccans; however, this is not strictly accurate. Both concepts describe the process of cause and effect and often encourage the individual to act in an upright way. In Hindu Vedanta literature, there is a comparable idea of threefold Karma referred to as Sanchita (accumulated works), Kriyamana, Agami, or Vartamana (current works), and Prarabdha (fructifying works), which are associated with past, present and future respectively. According to some traditions, the rule of three is not literal but symbolizes that our energy returns our way as many times as needed for us to learn the lesson associated with it.

According to occult author/researcher John Coughlin, the Law posits "a literal reward or punishment tied to one's actions, particularly when it comes to working magic". The law is not a universal article of faith among Wiccans, and "there are many Wiccans, experienced and new alike, who view the Law of Return as an over-elaboration on the Wiccan Rede." Some Wiccans believe that it is a modern innovation based on Christian morality.

The Rule of Three has been compared by Karl Lembke to other ethics of reciprocity, such as the concept of karma in Dharmic religions and the Golden Rule.

The Rule of Three has a possible prototype in a piece of Wiccan liturgy which first appeared in print in Gerald Gardner's 1949 novel High Magic's Aid:

However, The Threefold Law as an actual "law", was an interpretation of Wiccan ideas and ritual, first publicised by noted witch Raymond Buckland, in his books on Wicca.  Prior to this, Wiccan ideas of reciprocal ethics were far less defined and more often interpreted as a kind of general karma.

Raymond Buckland made a reference to an ethical threefold law in a 1968 article for Beyond magazine. The Rule of Three later features within a poem of 26 couplets titled "Rede of the Wiccae", published by Lady Gwen Thompson in 1975 in Green Egg vol. 8, no. 69 and attributed to her grandmother Adriana Porter. The threefold rule is referenced often by the Wiccans of the Clan Mackenzie in the S.M. Stirling Emberverse novels.

This rule was described by the Dutch metal band Nemesea, in the song "Threefold Law", from the album Mana.

Notes

Further reading 
 Coughlin, John J. (2001). The Three-Fold Law: Part of "The Evolution of Pagan Ethics". Retrieved 8 December 2006.
 Wren (2000). The Law of Three. Retrieved 8 December 2006.

Wiccan terminology
Religious ethics
Concepts in ethics